Sultan Hussain Al-Hilaaly I Sri loka veeru Mahaa radhun was the sultan of Maldives from 1398 to 1409. He was the son of Hilaaly Kalo and Golhaa vehi kanbulo and also a brother of Sultan Hassan I. He ruled the country for 10 years until his death on 1409.

1409 deaths
14th-century sultans of the Maldives
Year of birth unknown
15th-century sultans of the Maldives